Pied-de-Borne is a commune in the Lozère département in southern France.

Geography
The commune is traversed by the river Chassezac.

See also
Communes of the Lozère department

References

Pieddeborne